The 2014–15 VELUX EHF Champions League was the 55th edition of Europe's premier club handball competition and the 22nd edition under the current EHF Champions League format. SG Flensburg-Handewitt were the defending champions.

FC Barcelona Handbol defeated Veszprém KC 28–23 in the final to win their eighth EHF Champions League title. The record winners of the European top flight also claimed one trophy of the Champions Cup (the EHF Champions League forerunner) in 1991.

Overview

Team allocation
League positions of the previous season shown in parentheses (TH: Title holders). 21 teams were directly qualified for the group stage.

Round and draw dates
Draws were held at the European Handball Federation headquarters in Vienna, Austria and the only exception was the VELUX EHF FINAL4 draw in the Botanic Garden of Cologne, Germany.

Qualification stage

Twelve teams took part in the qualification tournaments. They were drawn into three groups of four teams, where they played a semifinal and a final or third place match. The winners of the qualification tournaments, played on 6–7 September 2014, qualified for the group stage, while the eliminated teams were transferred to the 2014–15 EHF Cup. The draw took place on 26 June 2014, at 14:00 local time, in Vienna, Austria.

Seedings
The seedings were published on 23 June 2014.

Qualification tournament 1

Qualification tournament 2

Qualification tournament 3

Group stage

24 teams were drawn into four groups of six teams, where they played each other twice. The top four teams advanced to the knockout stage. The draw took place on 27 June 2014, at 18:00 local time, in Vienna, Austria.

Seedings
The seedings were published on 23 June 2014.

Group A

Group B

Group C

Group D

Knockout stage

The top four placed teams of each group advance to the knockout stage. In the round of 16 and the quarterfinals, the teams will play a home-and away series to determine the four participants of the final four, which then determines the winner.

Last 16
The draw was held on 24 February 2015 at 12:30 in Vienna, Austria. The first legs were played on 11–15 March and the second legs on 18–22 March 2015.

Seedings
The seedings were published on 23 February 2015.

A team from Pot 1 will face a team from Pot 4, a Pot 2 team will play against a team from Pot 3.

Matches

|}

Quarterfinals
The draw was held on 24 March 2015 at 11:30 in Vienna, Austria. The first legs were played on 8–12 April and the second legs on 15–19 April 2015.

Seedings
The seedings were published on 23 March 2015.

Matches

|}

Final four
The draw was held on 21 April 2015.

The final four will be held on 30–31 May 2015 at the Lanxess Arena, Cologne.

Top goalscorers
Statistics exclude qualifying round.

Awards

The All-star team of the Champions League 2014/15:

See also
2014–15 EHF Cup
2014–15 EHF Challenge Cup

References

External links
Official website

 
EHF Champions League seasons
Men's Champions League
Men's Champions League